Brachyopa obscura is a European species of hoverflies.

Distribution
These hoverflies are found in Russia.

References

Diptera of Europe
Eristalinae
Insects described in 1982
Taxa named by F. Christian Thompson